Volodymyr (secular name Vasyl Omelianovych Romaniuk, ; December 10, 1925, Khymchyn – July 14, 1995, Kyiv) was the Patriarch of the Ukrainian Orthodox Church – Kyiv Patriarchate. Initially consecrated as a bishop of the Ukrainian Autocephalous Orthodox Church by bishop Ioan in 1990, Volodymyr became one of the founders of the united Ukrainian Orthodox Church in June 1992.

Biography
He was an ex-political (member of OUN) prisoner who was imprisoned by communist Soviets for 17 years (1944–1954, 1972–1979).  In 1979 he became a member of the Ukrainian Helsinki Group, was exiled from 1979 till 1982, and became a political emigrant at the end of the 1980s. On July 1, 1976 Volodymyr renounced his Soviet citizenship.

Between 1987–1990, Vasyl Romaniuk lived in Canada and was a priest of the Ukrainian Orthodox Church of Canada.  Also he served under the Ukrainian Orthodox Church of the USA, whose Metropolitan was Metropolitan Mstyslav (later Patriarch of Kyiv). In 1990 with the onset of Perestroyka he returned to Ukraine and became Bishop of Uzhgorod and Vynohradiv. For a short period, he was Archbishop of Lviv and Sokal. In 1993, by the decree of Patriarch Mstyslav (Skrypnyk) he was excommunicated for accepting ordination from Metropolitan Filaret (Denysenko).

On October 22, 1993 he was elected Patriarch of the Ukrainian Orthodox Church – Kyiv Patriarchate.
On July 14, 1995 Patriarch Volodymyr (Romaniuk) suddenly died under somewhat mysterious circumstances, with the official diagnosis being causes related to a heart attack.  His burial took place on July 18, 1995. Many religious and faithful called the day of burial black Tuesday, because of confrontations that took place between members of the clergy, laypeople of different denominations and the UNA-UNSO members battling riot police, after an unsuccessful attempt to have him buried on the premises of the Saint Sophia Cathedral in Kyiv. At least two people were killed, dozens more injured.
Patriarch Volodymyr (Romaniuk) was succeeded by Metropolitan Filaret (Denysenko) who was enthroned as Patriarch of Kyiv and All Rus’ - Ukraine on October 22, 1995.

References

External links
Religious Information Service of Ukraine
Joseph R. Gregory Ukraine: Christians in Conflict
Video about Patriarch Volodymyr.

1925 births
1995 deaths
People from Ivano-Frankivsk Oblast
First Hierarchs of the Ukrainian Orthodox Church of the Kyivan Patriarchate
Burials in Kyiv by place
Victims of human rights abuses
Soviet human rights activists
Clergy removed from office
Ukrainian Helsinki Group
Soviet dissidents